Beulah Bondi  (born Beulah Bondy; May 3, 1889 – January 11, 1981) was an American character actress; she often played eccentric mothers and later grandmothers and wives, although she was known for numerous other roles. She began her acting career as a young child in theater, and after establishing herself as a Broadway stage actress in 1925, she reprised her role in Street Scene for the 1931 film version.  
 
She played supporting roles in several films during the 1930s, and was twice nominated for an Academy Award for Best Supporting Actress. She played the mother of James Stewart in four films: Of Human Hearts, Vivacious Lady, Mr. Smith Goes to Washington (1939), and It's a Wonderful Life (1946). Although at her height in Hollywood from the 1930s until the 1950s, Bondi never retired, and she continued acting well into her later years, at the age of 87 winning an Emmy Award for her guest-star role on The Waltons in 1976.

Life and career
Bondi was born in Chicago, Illinois, the daughter of Eva Suzanna (née Marble), an author, and Abraham O. Bondy, who worked in real estate. The family moved to Valparaiso, Indiana, when she was three, and Bondi began her acting career on the stage at age seven, playing Cedric Errol in a production of Little Lord Fauntleroy at the Memorial Opera House in Valparaiso. She graduated from the Frances Shimer Academy (later Shimer College) in 1907, and gained her bachelor's and master's degrees in oratory at Valparaiso University in 1916 and 1918.

She made her Broadway debut in Kenneth Seymour Webb's One of the Family at the 49th Street Theatre on December 21, 1925. She next appeared in another hit, Maxwell Anderson's Saturday's Children, in 1926.  Bondi's performance in Elmer Rice's Pulitzer Prize-winning Street Scene, which opened at the Playhouse Theatre on January 10, 1929, brought Bondi to the movies at the age of 43. Her debut movie role was as Emma Jones in Street Scene (1931), which starred Sylvia Sidney, and in which Bondi reprised her stage role, followed by "Mrs. Davidson" in Rain (1932), which starred Joan Crawford and Walter Huston.

She was one of the first five women to be nominated for an Academy Award in the newly created category of "Best Supporting Actress" for her work in The Gorgeous Hussy, although she lost the award to Gale Sondergaard. Two years later she was nominated again for Of Human Hearts and lost again, but her reputation as a character actress kept her employed. She would most often be seen in the role of the mother of the star of the film for the rest of her career, with the exception of Make Way for Tomorrow (1937) as the abandoned Depression-era 'Ma' Cooper. She often played mature roles in her early film career even though she was only in her early 40s. In 1940 Bondi played Mrs. Webb in Our Town and Granny Tucker in The Southerner, directed by Jean Renoir and released in 1945.

For her contributions to the film industry, Bondi received a motion -picture star on the Hollywood Walk of Fame in 1960, located at 1718 Vine Street.

Although Bondi played mothers and grandmothers on screen, she was a lifelong bachelorette with no children. She admitted, "I never regretted the choice of a career over marriage, it was a difficult decision and I've never been sorry."

Television
Bondi's television credits include Alfred Hitchcock Presents and  Howard Richardson's Ark of Safety on the Goodyear Television Playhouse. She appeared with Jan Clayton in "The Prairie Story" on NBC's Wagon Train. She made a guest appearance on Perry Mason in 1963 when she played the role of Sophia Stone in "The Case of the Nebulous Nephew".

Bondi made her final appearances as Martha Corinne Walton on The Waltons in the episodes "The Conflict" (September 1974) and "The Pony Cart" (December 1976). She received an Emmy for Outstanding Lead Actress for a Single Appearance in a Drama or Comedy Series for her performance in "The Pony Cart". When her name was called, it first appeared that she was not present, but she received a standing ovation as she walked slowly to the podium, from which she thanked the audience for honoring her while she was still living.

Death
Bondi died from pulmonary complications caused by broken ribs suffered when she tripped over her cat in her home on January 11, 1981, at age 91.

Complete filmography

Radio appearances

See also

 List of actors with Academy Award nominations

References

Further reading

External links

Great Character Actors

1889 births
1981 deaths
20th-century American actresses
Accidental deaths from falls
Accidental deaths in California
Actresses from Indiana
American film actresses
American stage actresses
American television actresses
Emmy Award winners
People from Valparaiso, Indiana
Shimer College alumni
Valparaiso University alumni